Samaritan's Purse is an evangelical Christian humanitarian aid organization that provides aid to people in physical need as a key part of its Christian missionary work. The organization's president is Franklin Graham, son of Christian evangelist Billy Graham. The name of the organization is derived from the New Testament Parable of the Good Samaritan. With international headquarters in Boone, North Carolina, the organization also maintains warehouse and aviation facilities in nearby North Wilkesboro and Greensboro, North Carolina.

The organization has been criticized for requiring volunteers to sign a controversial Statement of Faith which condemns homosexuality and same-sex marriage. The organization's board of directors, which includes his son, has also been criticized for the $661,000 yearly salary paid to Graham, which is 40–50% more than similar non-profit organizations.

History 
Samaritan's Purse was founded in 1970 by Baptist pastor Robert Pierce (Bob), the founder of World Vision International, in Boone, North Carolina.

Franklin Graham met Pierce in 1973, and they made several trips together to visit relief projects and missionary partners in Asia and elsewhere. Graham became president of Samaritan's Purse in 1979 following Pierce's death in 1978.

By 2022, Samaritan's Purse had offices in the United States, Australia, Canada, Germany, Ireland, Japan Hong Kong, the Netherlands and the United Kingdom; the organization provides assistance in more than 100 countries. It operates worldwide as Samaritan's Purse, Ippan Shadan Houjin in Japan and as the Emmanuel Group, a wholly owned aircraft title holding corporation formed in 2004.

Programs 
Samaritan's Purse includes several ongoing ministries.

 Disaster Relief responds to emergency situations.
 World Medical Mission, the medical arm of Samaritan's Purse, was founded in 1977 by brothers Dr. Richard Furman and Dr. Lowell Furman to enable doctors to serve short-term assignments at overwhelmed missionary hospitals.
 Children's Heart Project provides surgery for children born with heart defects in countries where proper care is not available.
 Turn on the Tap is a campaign to provide safe drinking water in the developing world.
 Operation Heal Our Patriots provides lodging and outdoor activities in Alaska for wounded veterans and their spouses.

Operation Christmas Child
Operation Christmas Child was created in 1990 by Dave Cooke and his wife Gill for children in Romania. Each November thousands of churches, schools, groups and individual donors prepare and collect shoeboxes filled with toys, school supplies, personal items, and other small gifts. A booklet of Bible stories is often distributed alongside the shoebox gifts which are given to children based on need alone, regardless of their faith. These boxes are then distributed overseas by volunteers. , over 124 million boxes had been delivered.

The program uses "follow-up" evangelism with pamphlets of Bible stories that are given to families that receive the boxes, and an organizer for Operation Christmas Child says his goal every day is to "expand [God's] kingdom through Operation Christmas Child."

The follow-up evangelism program of Operation Christmas Child is called "The Greatest Journey". It is a 12-week discipleship program for children who receive shoebox gifts.

Emergency aid

The organization's medical mission in Liberia, West Africa, was one of only two medical NGOs active in Liberia during the beginning of the 2014 Ebola outbreak. Samaritan's Purse and SIM USA both have been actively engaged in treating the outbreak of Ebola hemorrhagic fever in Liberia. On August 1, 2014, the organization announced that it was evacuating 60 nonessential personnel from Liberia. Dr. Kent Brantly, a Texas-based doctor working for the organization, was the first U.S. citizen to contract the Ebola virus in Liberia while treating the disease. He arrived in the United States on Saturday, August 2, and was treated and subsequently released after nearly three weeks in a special isolation unit of Emory University Hospital in Atlanta, Georgia. The organization recorded their mission in Liberia in the documentary Facing Darkness. Samaritan's Purse has a fleet of 21 planes and 2 helicopters for the emergency transport of basic necessities and aid workers.

Ukraine aid 
The organization stepped efforts to aid Ukraine in the midst of the Russian-Ukrainian conflict in 2022. The organization donated various supplies especially for the youth in schools such as medication, food, supplies, blankets, tarps, and bags. The donations were made through various methods of transportation such as semi trucks being loaded with roughly 80,000 donation goods, being transferred at Piedmont Triad International Airport on the DC-8 airplane, and then being air lifted to Poland where the good are transported across the border to Ukraine. The organization accomplished its 30th airlift donation in the month of September having started in February, equating to roughly 4 airlifts per month. It is estimated that 5.5 million Ukrainians were aided due to the efforts with food, water, and supplies. Furthermore, the organization provided roughly 30 emergency field support hospitals in Lviv with the result of aiding nearly 18,000 patients.

Financials 
The organization's 2021 financial statement listed just $758 million in cash donations and another $245 million in donated goods and services. 85% of its $676 million in expenses went ministry expenses with the largest share (42%) going to their Operation Christmas Child project and 17% to emergency relief and 7% to its medical missions. Most expenses come from direct costs in delivering emergency and medical relief and Operation Christmas Child (57%) along with staff salaries and other employment expenses (20%).

The organization has received a 4 star rating (out of 4 stars) from the monitoring organization Charity Navigator.

In 2020, Samaritan's Purse declined federal funding from the Trump administration originally withheld from the World Health Organization.

Facilities and fleets 

Based in Boone, North Carolina, the organization also maintains warehouse and administrative facilities in North Wilkesboro, North Carolina including a  former bottling plant and newly constructed  facility where its 5 custom tractor trailers used for distributing relief supplies are staged.

The organization also operates a fleet of 23 passenger, cargo, and executive aircraft positioned around the world, registered in the organizations name and to the Emmanuel Group, a holding company.

Operations focused at their maintenance facilities at the Piedmont Triad International Airport, along with additional hanger facilities at the Wilkes County Airport. A $1.5 million taxiway was built by the State of North Carolina 2019 to serve the organization's second hanger at that airport under construction at the time. Aircraft serve humanitarian relief missions as well as executive transportation.

 Douglas DC-8-72-CF: configured to support up to 32 passengers and 10 cargo pallets. The aircraft was built in 1968 and began service for Finnair, then by the French Air Force beginning in 1985, then by charter airline Air Transport International before being registered to Samaritan's Purse in 2015. The aircraft recently flew missions an average of once per month.
 Douglas DC-3 registered N467SP in 2010, based in Kenya.
 Boeing 757-200, configured as a freighter. Built in 1985, began service as a passenger aircraft with Eastern Airlines then several British and Icelandic airlines. Converter to a freighter in 2006 where it flew for DHL and other airlines before being registered as N783SP in 2022.
 Beech Super King B200 turboprop registered as N874SP in 2010.
 Beech Super King B300 turboprop registered as N841KA in 2020
 Two CASA 212-CC cargo aircraft designed for take off and landing from short runways. Registered as N831SP and N499SP in 2010.
 Five Cesna 208 nine passenger aircraft
 A Cesna 172 Skyhawk and a Cesna 182E Skyland 2 seat aircraft.
 Cessna A185F six seat aircraft originally designed for agricultural use.
 One de Havilland Canada DHC-3 Otter and two Quest Kodiak 100 turboprop bush planes for transportation around Alaska including to the organization's retreat in Port Alsworth, Alaska 
 Bell 206-L4 helicopter registered to Samaritan's Purse in 2016 as N146SP.
 Gulfstream G550 19 passenger executive aircraft, registered as N521GV to Emmanuel Group.
 Dassault Falcon 50 9 passenger executive aircraft, registered as  N50FJ to Emmanuel Group.
 Dassault Falcon 900EX 13 passenger executive aircraft, registered as N900FJ to Emmanuel Group.

Previous aircraft include a Mitsubishi MU 2 purchased in the mid-1990s and a Learjet 45 bought in 2020 and sold in 2021.

The organization donated two Beechcraft King Air B200 aircraft in 2011 to a similar Micronesia based organization.

Controversy 
In March 2001, The New York Times reported that Samaritan's Purse had "blurred the line between church and state" in the way it had distributed publicly funded aid to victims of the January 2001 and February 2001 El Salvador earthquakes. Residents from several villages stated they first had to sit through a half-hour prayer meeting before receiving assistance. In a statement, USAID said Samaritan's Purse had not violated federal guidelines, but emphasized the need for the organization to "maintain adequate and sufficient separation" between prayer sessions and publicly funded activities.

In 2003, Islamic leaders criticized Samaritan's Purse within the United Kingdom after its president, Franklin Graham, stated that Islam is a "very evil and wicked religion", leading to opposition campaigns by the Islamic leaders. Samaritan's Purse responded to accusations of being anti-Islamic by highlighting their long history of non-denominational co-operation and charity work in Baghdad without attempting to preach or proselytize.

The Operation Christmas Child project has been criticized in several countries, most notably in the UK, but also in Ireland, India and Canada. In the United States, Ibrahim Hooper of the Council on American-Islamic Relations, has stated that such religion-and-relief groups are "using their position of power to try to persuade people to leave their faith." In 2003, The British supermarket chain Co-op and South Wales Fire Service both suspended their support for the project after numerous complaints about its religious connections. Samaritan's Purse responded by stating that Christian literature was only handed out where it was deemed appropriate.

Franklin Graham drew scrutiny in 2009 for drawing a full-time salary from Samaritan's Purse, while at the same time receiving a full-time salary from Billy Graham Evangelistic Association (BGEA). This was called into question after his 2008 compensation from both organizations totaled $1.2 million.  (Most of this was the result of a new IRS rule that required him to re-report deferred retirement contributions that had already been reported over the previous three years.)  Some experts on non-profits have questioned whether one person can perform two full-time jobs leading organizations that employ hundreds and spend hundreds of millions around the world. In response to the questions about his compensation, Graham decided to give up his salary from BGEA, stating his calling to the ministry "was never based on compensation." He also had contributions to his retirement plans suspended until the economy bounced back. However, Graham was again criticized in 2015 when it was revealed he had again taken up his salary from BGEA, and that his annual compensation was significantly higher than that of the CEO's of similar but much larger non-profit organisations.

In 2010, an American woman and two Sudanese men were kidnapped while working for Samaritan's Purse in Sudan. The two men were released promptly, but the woman was held for three months. Upon her return to the US, she sued Samaritan's Purse and their security contractor, Clayton Consultants, a hostage negotiation consultancy owned by Triple Canopy, accusing the organization "of failing to train its security personnel adequately and of willfully ignoring warning signs that abductions were a threat to foreigners." The organization settled out of court in March 2012.

In May 2013 Franklin Graham wrote a letter to President Obama stating his concern that the IRS targeted Samaritan's Purse prior to the 2012 United States presidential election with a partisan audit.

In August 2013, Thankyou Group announced that it would no longer support Samaritan's Purse because it is not a signatory to the code of conduct run by the Australian Council for International Development, which bans aid as a vehicle for promoting religion or political groups.

In October 2014, Samaritan's Purse threatened legal action in the UK against the posters of online comments on the discussion forum Mumsnet. The resultant letters prompted one of the busiest discussions on the site's "Am I being Unreasonable" forum.

Response to the COVID-19 outbreak

Italy 
On March 17, 2020, Samaritan's Purse dispatched over 60 disaster response specialists, 20 tons of medical equipment and a field hospital to Cremona, Italy which started operations on March 20, 2020.

Alaska 
Samaritans' Purse airlifted 8 tons of medical supplies to Alaska on April 7, 2020, to help provide supplies to remote communities.

New York 
In cooperation with New York City's Mount Sinai Hospital, Samaritan's Purse constructed a 14 tent, 68-bed field hospital in Central Park on March 29, 2020, to increase Mount Sinai's surge capacity. Through April, over 190 people were treated there. By early May, all patients had been discharged, and there were plans to dismantle the tents.

Criticism 
Before the field hospital opened, journalists, politicians and LGBTQ activists raised concerns that it was only recruiting Christian medical staff and that it would provide inadequate and discriminatory care. According to NBC News and Gothamist, volunteers are required to adhere to a statement of faith, agreeing to a definition of marriage as "exclusively the union of one genetic male and one genetic female" and acknowledging that "[God] will banish the unrighteous to everlasting punishment in hell." New York Mayor Bill de Blasio stated that the presence of Samaritan's Purse was "very troubling," while New York State Senator Brad Hoylman told NBC News that he considered it "a shame that the federal government has left us in the position of having to accept charity from such bigots". Franklin Graham later responded to Hoylman's request for public reassurance by stating: "We do not make distinctions about an individual's religion, race, sexual orientation, or economic status. We certainly do not discriminate, and we have a decades-long track record that confirms just that." New York City's Commission on Human Rights closed an investigation into the hospital after finding no evidence it had discriminated against patients. The group's departure was hailed as a victory by LGBTQ rights activists. Volunteers are required to adhere to a statement of faith, agreeing to a definition of marriage as "exclusively the union of one genetic male and one genetic female" and acknowledging that "[God] will banish the unrighteous to everlasting punishment in hell."

Joint plans between Mount Sinai Hospital, Samaritan's Purse and the Episcopal Diocese of New York to convert the Cathedral of St. John the Divine into a 200-bed hospital were shelved on April 9, 2020. Although this decision was attributed at least in part to the assessment that virus-related hospitalizations had already plateaued, Bishop Andrew M.L. Dietsche of the Episcopal Diocese of New York later said that Graham's "exclusionary" and "narrow" attitude about Christianity was central to the decision. Specifically, the Samaritan's Purse requires its employees and volunteers to oppose gay marriage, which, in Dietsche's words, was incompatible with the work the New York Diocese had done "around the full inclusion of gay and lesbian people."

References

External links 

 

Christian charities based in the United States
Christian organizations established in the 20th century
Humanitarian aid organizations
International charities
Charities based in North Carolina
Christian organizations established in 1970
Boone, North Carolina
1970 establishments in the United States
Evangelical Christian humanitarian organizations